The 2013 Indiana Hoosiers baseball team represented the Indiana University Bloomington in the 2013 NCAA Division I baseball season.  The Hoosiers were coached by Tracy Smith, in his eighth season, and played their home games at Bart Kaufman Field.

The Hoosiers finished with 49 wins, the most in school history, against 16 losses overall, and 17–7 in the Big Ten Conference, earning the conference championship.  They claimed the 2013 Big Ten Conference baseball tournament Championship, their third title in that event, and reached the College World Series for the first time in their history, where they finished 1–2, eliminated by Oregon State 1–0.

Roster

Coaches

Schedule

Bloomington Regional 

 Bloomington Regional Scores Source

Tallahassee Super Regional

Ranking movements

References

Indiana Hoosiers baseball seasons
Indiana
College World Series seasons
Big Ten Conference baseball champion seasons
2013 NCAA Division I baseball tournament participants